The Cryptonemiales is a defunct algal order; it is synonymous with the Halymeniales and has significant overlap with the Nemastomatales.

References

Red algae orders
Obsolete eukaryote taxa